Unexpectedly Yours is a 2017 Philippine romantic comedy film directed by Cathy Garcia-Molina, starring Sharon Cuneta, Joshua Garcia, Julia Barretto and Robin Padilla. The film marks the reunion of Cuneta and Padilla in the big-screen after 16 years since Maging Sino Ka Man (1991), Di Na Natuto (1993). and Pagdating Ng Panahon (2001), which were all produced by Viva Films. This is also the third movie together of the loveteam of Julia Barretto and Joshua Garcia after two previous box-office hits namely Vince and Kath and James (2016) and Love You to the Stars and Back (2017). The film was produced and released by Star Cinema on November 29, 2017.

Cast

Main cast

 Sharon Cuneta as Patricia Rose "Patty" Ignacio-Gonzales
 Robin Padilla as  Francisco "Cocoy" Manlangit
 Julia Barretto as Yanni Gonzales
 Joshua Garcia as Jason Manlangit

Supporting cast
 Maritoni Fernandez as Rachelle
 Yayo Aguila as Lulu
 Marina Benipayo as Cherie
 Marissa Delgado as Mila
 Carmi Martin as Elena
 Toby Alejar as Doc
 Denise Joaquin as Angie
 Pamu Pamorada as Eunice
 Minnie Aguilar as Yaya
 Hyubs Azarcon as Ferdie
 Philip Lazaro as Philip
 MJ Lastimosa as Liz

Special participation
 John Estrada as Yael
 Pilar Pilapil as Catalina
 Maxene Magalona as Georgina
 Jameson Blake as Kurt
 Ruben Maria Soriquez as Mr. Ricardo

Release
Unexpectedly Yours was released on November 29, 2017, to Philippine cinemas. The film was graded "A" by the Cinema Evaluation Board of the Philippines.
. As of December 10, 2017, the total movie sales is 157million pesos

Box office
The film was released on November 29, 2017, initially in 200 cinemas. Unexpectedly Yours has grossed ₱14 million on its first day of showing, After three days, the film grossed ₱50 million. After six  days, the film grossed ₱100 million. After 12 days, the film grossed ₱157 million.  On its 19th day, the film grossed ₱218 million worldwide. On its 23rd day, the film grossed ₱249 million worldwide in the box office.

See also 
List of films produced and released by Star Cinema

References

External links
 

2017 films
Philippine romantic comedy films
Star Cinema films